Staurocladia is a genus of anthomedusan hydrozoans. Its former family Eleutheriidae is now included in the Cladonematidae.

Species include:
Staurocladia acuminata
Staurocladia alternata
Staurocladia bilateralis 	  	 
Staurocladia charcoti 
Staurocladia haswelli 	 
Staurocladia oahuensis	 
Staurocladia portmanni	
Staurocladia schizogena
Staurocladia ulvae	
Staurocladia vallentini 
Staurocladia wellingtoni

References

Cladonematidae
Hydrozoan genera